Oscar Jerome Friend (January 8, 1897 – January 19, 1963) began his career primarily as a pulp fiction writer in various genres including horror, Westerns, science fiction, and detective fiction. As a pulp writer he worked with Wonder Stories, Startling Stories, Strange Stories, Captain Future and Thrilling Wonder Stories. As his career progressed, Oscar Friend authored many novels, which were published worldwide. Friend wrote screenplays, worked as an editor on periodicals, and was co-editor on several anthologies. Finally, he took the helm of a literary agency.

Biography
Oscar Jerome Friend was born on January 8, 1897, in St. Louis, Missouri, to Jinnie L. and Joseph Friend. He married Irene Ozment in 1917.

Oscar Friend moved to Los Angeles at the request of Walt Disney Productions, and worked for some time as a scriptwriter for films at Universal Studios before returning to New York.

He died in January 1963.

Legacy
Upon the death of his friend and literary agent, Otis Kline, Oscar Friend acquired ownership of his company, Otis Kline Associates. Friend, with the partnership of his wife Irene Ozment Friend, became one of the foremost international science fiction and fantasy agents of the 1950s and 1960s. Oscar Friend's clients included Isaac Asimov, Robert A. Heinlein, Ray Bradbury, Robert E. Howard, Theodore Sturgeon, Murray Leinster, and Frank Herbert.

Novels

Friend's thrillers were written under the pen name Owen Fox Jerome. He also used the pen names Ford Smith & Frank Johnson for his science fiction novels, and the pseudonym Sergeant Saturn as editor.

Science Fiction

  The Kid From Mars (1948) Disney approached Oscar J. Friend just after World War II, planning to make this novel into a musical with Danny Kaye, but the film plans fell through due to a change in Kaye's retirement plans. The film rights to the book were again optioned by Disney in the 1990s.
  Of Jovian Build (1938)
  The Worms Turn (1940)
  The Stolen Spectrum (1940s)
  The Water World (1941)
  The Molecule Monsters (1942, 1950)
  Roar of the Rocket (1950)
  The Star Men (1953)

Westerns

 Click of Triangle T (1925) published first as a novel, then produced as a film by Universal Pictures, starring Hoot Gibson
 The Round Up (1924)
 The Bullet Eater (1925)
 The Wolf of Wildcat Mountain (1926)
 Gun Harvest (1927, republished 1948)
 Bloody Ground (1928)
 The Mississippi Hawk (1929)
 The Hawk of Hazard (1929)
 The Maverick (1930)
 Half Moon Ranch (1931)
 The Range Maverick (1934)
 Without Benefit of Bullets (1941)
 The Wedding Gift (1943)
 Oklahoma Gun Song (1944)
 Love's Gun Doctor (1944)
 Gun Trail to Glory (1940s)
 Betty of the Lazy W (1940s)
 The Range Doctor (1948)
 Guns of Powder River (first published under this title in the UK in 1950) [republished in 1963 in the US as Action at Powder River under the pen name Ford Smith]
 The Last Raid (1952)
 Lobo Brand (1954)

Thrillers

 The Hand Of Horror (1927)
 The Red Kite Clue (1928)
 Domes of Silence (1929)
 The Golf Course Murders (1929) published in the U.S. and the U.K.
 The Murder at Avalon Arms (1931) published in the U.S. and the U.K.
 The Cat and the Fiddle (19__)
 Murder - As Usual (1942)
 Shadow Justice (1942)
 The Corpse Awaits (1946)
 Death Script (19__)
 A Night at Club Bagdad (1950)
 Double Life (1959)
 The Five Assassins (1958)
 Leave Everything to Me (1959)

Anthologies co-edited by Oscar J. Friend
From Off This World (1949) with Leo Margulies
My Best Science Fiction Story (1949) with Leo Margulies
Giant Anthology of SF (1954) with Leo Margulies
Giant Anthology of Science Fiction (1954) with Leo Margulies
Race to the Stars (1958) with Leo Margulies

References
The Encyclopedia of Science Fiction, page 454.

External links
 
 

1897 births
1963 deaths
20th-century American male writers
20th-century American novelists
20th-century American short story writers
American male novelists
American male short story writers
American science fiction writers
American speculative fiction editors
Pulp fiction writers
Science fiction editors
Western (genre) writers